La Villetelle is a commune in the Creuse department in the Nouvelle-Aquitaine region in central France.

Geography

The river Tardes forms all of the commune's southwestern border.

Population

Sights
 The nineteenth-century church of St.Laurent.
 A seventeenth-century coaching inn.
 The château de Lavaud-Provins.

See also
Communes of the Creuse department

References

Communes of Creuse